The Small Guild is a building situated in Riga, Latvia, at 3/5 Amatu Street. The building was erected in the years 1864—66 after a project by architect Johann Felsko in Neo-Gothic style.

References 

Buildings and structures completed in 1866
Buildings and structures in Riga
Tourist attractions in Riga
1866 establishments in the Russian Empire